The Lego Movie 2: The Second Part (Original Motion Picture Soundtrack) is the soundtrack to the 2019 film of the same name, which is the sequel to the 2014 film The Lego Movie, the fourth instalment overall in the franchise and the last film in the franchise to be produced and distributed by Warner Bros. Pictures. and Warner Animation Group. The album featured 10 songs performed by various artists, including a few tracks performed by the cast members. The songs were written by Shawn Patterson, Christopher Miller and Jon Lajoie, along with prominent songwriters.

Two songs – "Catchy Song" performed by Dillon Francis, T-Pain and Alaya High  That Girl Lay Lay, and "Super Cool" by Beck, Robyn and The Lonely Island were released as singles, and the album was released on February 7, 2019. The Lego Movie 2: The Second Part (Original Motion Picture Score), featured original score composed by Mark Mothersbaugh, who scored for the predecessor and was released on the same day, along with its soundtrack. Both the albums were distributed by WaterTower Music.

Development 
After the success of "Everything Is Awesome" created for the first film, Phil Lord and Christopher Miller wanted a similar song for the sequel. The duo asked songwriter Jon Lajoie (the primary artist) to write a track that would elicit mixed feelings. According to Lajoie, he described the track as "49 percent annoying and 51 percent fun to listen to” which eventually became "Catchy Song". The track principally featured as its only lyric the repeated phrase "This song's gonna get stuck inside your head", after Lajoie initially sang the phrase in his bathroom while brainstorming about the song lyrics. He initially wrote an annoying version of the track, as he wanted it as "a song that is supposed to drive insane, something that sort of feels creepy and brainwashy" but after watching the film, he changed it to a more enjoyable version of the track.

"Catchy Song" was recorded with several artists and Lajoie had wrote 20 different verses of the song, but the producers were not satisfied with the demos. Later, music producer Dillon Francis, whom Lajoie closely associated with, had agreed to perform the track. In addition, T-Pain and Alaya High, under her stage name That Girl Lay Lay, had crooned the version's choral portions. Because director Mike Mitchell and Lajoie initially intended the song would attain popularity among kids, and felt that the repeated verses might irritate parents, they comically apologized to parents after the song's release. Lajoie found that "Everything is Awesome" was "annoyingly catchy", and the only way that they could outdo that was "Dial the 'annoying' up to 11!".

Lajoie initially had planned to include a track called "All Is Amazing" which he had recorded earlier, but could not use it in the album. He found the track too similar to "Everything Is Awesome" except for minor tweaks to the lyrics and melody . While he initially found the song "funny" in parts, he felt it was "not as funny" being heard in full, which prompted him to omit the track from the album. Another song he planned to write, but later omitted, was "It’s Hard to Follow Up a Hit Song". The Tween Dream remixed version of "Everything Is Awesome" (from the first film) was featured in the soundtrack with Eban Schletter performing the track with Garfunkel and Oates. A parodic reprise of the track titled "Everything's Not Awesome" is performed by the film's cast and featured additional lyrics by Shawn Patterson and Lajoie.

Track listing

Reception 
Critical response to the film's soundtrack was positive, with Brick Fanatics wrote "the film has an original soundtrack that is a pleasant surprise, definitely worthy of sitting alongside the best animated soundtracks that other, more established animation studios have to offer." The score, however received mixed response. Zanobard reviews gave 3/10 to the score stating that "the score is all over the place. Due to its complete and utter lack of any thematic material, it has no real cohesive narrative and so ends up being just a loose and at points bizarre mess of different musical genres. The music constantly jumps from one area to another, usually spanning several massively different areas of music just in one track. Not only does this make the score very confusing to try and follow, but it also ends up being a particularly unenjoyable album experience as well. The music frequently starts and stops and speeds up and slows down and changes instruments and shifts styles – and after a while you just don’t want to listen to it anymore. It’s too much like hard work."

Filmtracks.com criticised Mothersbaugh's score and stated "A few new ideas from Mothersbaugh for The Lego Movie 2 do begin to emerge in the final ten minutes, but the score by then has exhausted you with nonsensically unique personality in each of its haphazard orchestral and synthetic romps [...] The layers of post-production electronics aren't terrible, but they serve little purpose when paired with the aimless orchestral recordings. Ultimately, the loss of the themes from the first film's score and the lack of clear interpolation of this film's song melodies into the score are disqualifying alone. Add to that an indecisive and meandering new narrative in the score and you get a very disappointing score-only product on album."

Chart performance

Notes

References 

2019 soundtrack albums
WaterTower Music soundtracks
Film scores
The Lego Movie (franchise)
Animated film soundtracks